Octavio Víctor "Cookie" Rojas Rivas (born March 6, 1939), is a Cuban former professional baseball second baseman / outfielder, coach, and manager, who played in Major League Baseball (MLB) for the Cincinnati Reds, Philadelphia Phillies, St. Louis Cardinals, and Kansas City Royals. A five-time All-Star player, Rojas is currently the Miami Marlins' Spanish-language television color commentator. Rojas batted and threw right-handed.

Early life and minor leagues
Playing baseball over the objections of his father, who wanted him to be a doctor, Rojas signed his first professional baseball contract with the Cincinnati Reds as a 17-year-old amateur free agent prior to the start of the 1956 season. Rojas was then assigned to Cincinnati's D-level team, the West Palm Beach Sun Chiefs in the Florida State League. From 1957 to 1959, Rojas would make steady progress through the Reds' minor league system, playing for the Wausau Lumberjacks in the C-level Northern League in 1957, the Savannah Redlegs in the Single A Sally League in 1958, before coming home and playing for the Havana Sugar Kings in the AAA International League. His advancement through the system was steady despite his batting average falling every year between 1956 and 1960, finally bottoming out at .225. Although he possessed an above-average glove, the Reds were not sure he'd ever hit enough to play regularly in the majors. Consequently, he would spend the next three seasons at AAA, playing for Havana and the Jersey City Jerseys, where he would continue to struggle with his bat while being blocked in the majors by superior Reds' second basemen in All Stars Johnny Temple, Billy Martin, and Don Blasingame. Rojas would finally go north with the Reds at the beginning of the 1962 season and would make his major league debut on April 10. However, he would continue to show little at the plate, hitting .221 with only 2 extra base hits in 78 at bats, and would be sent down to the AAA Dallas-Fort Worth Spurs for the remainder of the season.

Major league career
After the 1962 season, Rojas was traded to the Philadelphia Phillies for relief pitcher Jim Owens. Although the Phillies already had an All-Star second baseman in fellow Cuban Tony Taylor, Rojas had seen the last of the minor leagues and would man second in 27 games in 1963. Although he became the regular Phillies second baseman in 1965, Rojas would go on to play at every fielding position, including catcher and pitcher, but would see the bulk of his playing time in the outfield and shortstop in addition to second base. Getting more playing time helped improve his batting, as Rojas hit .291 in 1964 and a career-high .303 in 1965, when he was named to his first All-Star team.  As a Phillie, Rojas teamed with shortstop Bobby Wine in a stellar double-play combination that media and fans began to refer as “The Plays of Wine and Rojas,” a takeoff of the song, The Days of Wine and Roses.

Following the 1969 season in which Rojas hit only .228 and hot prospect Denny Doyle tore through AAA with a .310 average, the Phillies decided to include him in the blockbuster trade that sent slugging first baseman Dick Allen and right-handed pitcher Jerry Johnson to the St. Louis Cardinals for centerfielder Curt Flood, catcher Tim McCarver, outfielder Byron Browne, and left-handed pitcher Joe Hoerner, the trade that led ultimately to Major League baseball free agency. By the time the Phillies traded Rojas to the Cardinals in 1970, it appeared his career might be over, as he was hitting only .106 going into the June trading deadline. St. Louis in turn traded him to the Kansas City Royals for outfielder/third baseman Fred Rico on June 13.  Kansas City, a team in only its second year of existence, wanted a veteran presence to steady its infield, and in return for the career–minor leaguer Rico, the Royals gained a player who would man second base for most of the next eight seasons and appear in four consecutive All-Star games from 1971 to 1974.

In April 1970, at least one news report mistakenly said Rojas was critically injured in an auto accident. In fact it was former major leaguer Minnie Rojas. In the 1972 All-Star Game in Atlanta, he hit a pinch-hit, two-run homer in the eighth inning, which was the first time that a non-American-born player had ever homered for the American League in the mid-summer classic.

Though a fan favorite, Rojas lost his job as the Royals' starting second baseman to Frank White in 1976, who was much younger than the 37-year-old Rojas and both hit and fielded better than Rojas. Remaining with the team for two more years, Rojas filled a utility role with the team, playing at first, second and third base, and designated hitter. After being released by the team after the 1977 season, Rojas spent 1978 on the sidelines. Despite signing with the Chicago Cubs on September 1, he did not get into a game with the team and retired from baseball.

Rojas is currently in second place on the Royals all-time list of games played at second base with 789, second only to White.

Career statistics

His main position was second base, recording a .984 fielding percentage in 1445 games at that position, he has played all other infield (including catcher) and outfield positions as well.

Coaching career
After his playing career, Rojas coached and scouted for various teams. From 1978 to 1981 he was a coach for the Chicago Cubs. In 1988, he became only the third Cuban-born manager in major-league history when he took the helm of the California Angels, whom he had guided to fourth place with a 75–79 record before being replaced with Moose Stubing with eight games left in the season (with the Angels losing all eight games). In 1996, Rojas managed one game for the Florida Marlins after manager Rene Lachemann was fired before John Boles finished the season for the Marlins.

During the 1999 playoffs, while coaching third base for the New York Mets, Rojas was suspended for five games for getting into a shoving match with umpire Charlie Williams while arguing a foul ball call. Rojas also served as the team's third base coach during the 2000 season, in which they appeared in the World Series. From 2001 to 2002 he was bench coach with the Toronto Blue Jays and was unofficial manager for 3 games in 2001.

For the 2002 season, Rojas was third base coach for the Toronto Blue Jays.

Personal life
Rojas' second youngest son, Victor, was previously the lead play-by-play announcer for the Los Angeles Angels, and is now the general manager of the Frisco RoughRiders. His second-oldest son, Mike, is a minor league manager and former MLB bullpen coach for the Detroit Tigers and Seattle Mariners.

In 2011, he was inducted into the Hispanic Heritage Baseball Museum Hall of Fame.

References

External links

Cookie Rojas at SABR (Baseball BioProject)
Cookie Rojas at Baseball Almanac
Cookie Rojas at Baseballbiography.com
Cookie Rojas at Pura Pelota (Venezuelan Professional Baseball League)
Cookie Rojas at Ultimate Mets Database

1939 births
Living people
Águilas Cibaeñas players
Cuban expatriate baseball players in the Dominican Republic
Águilas del Zulia players
American League All-Stars
California Angels announcers
California Angels managers
California Angels scouts
Chicago Cubs coaches
Cienfuegos players
Dallas Rangers players
Florida Marlins coaches
Florida Marlins managers
Havana Sugar Kings players
Jersey City Jerseys players
Kansas City Royals coaches
Kansas City Royals players
Leones del Caracas players
Cuban expatriate baseball players in Venezuela
Major League Baseball broadcasters
Major League Baseball bench coaches
Major League Baseball first base coaches
Major League Baseball third base coaches
Major League Baseball second basemen
Major League Baseball players from Cuba
Cuban expatriate baseball players in the United States
Miami Marlins announcers
Minor league baseball managers
National League All-Stars
New York Mets coaches
Baseball players from Havana
Philadelphia Phillies players
St. Louis Cardinals players
Tigres de Aragua players
Toronto Blue Jays coaches
Wausau Lumberjacks players
West Palm Beach Sun Chiefs players
Cuban expatriate baseball players in Nicaragua